Uritsky (masculine), Uritskaya (feminine), or Uritskoye (neuter) may refer to:
Moisei Uritsky (1873–1918), Russian Bolshevik revolutionary leader
Uritsky factory (or simply Uritsky), the former name of Trolza, a large trolleybus manufacturer in Russia
Uritsky District, a district of Oryol Oblast, Russia
Uritsky (rural locality) (Uritskaya, Uritskoye), name of several rural localities in Russia